Eugene Grazia (July 29, 1934 – November 9, 2014) was an American ice hockey player. He won a gold medal at the 1960 Winter Olympics. He was born in West Springfield, Massachusetts.

External links
 
 Eugene Grazia's bio at databaseOlympics
 Eugene Grazia's obituary

1934 births
2014 deaths
American men's ice hockey forwards
Ice hockey players from Massachusetts
Ice hockey players at the 1960 Winter Olympics
Medalists at the 1960 Winter Olympics
Olympic gold medalists for the United States in ice hockey
People from West Springfield, Massachusetts
20th-century American people